Stahlbahnwerke Freudenstein is a defunct German railway company.

Company history 

The company was founded in 1891 by the merchant Julius Freudenstein; until then, Freudenstein had worked for Orenstein & Koppel. Originally, the company traded in track and materials for railways.  

In 1895, Freudenstein acquired a small manufacturing facility in Tempelhof, Berlin for the construction of its own locomotives. At the same time, the company became a limited company.

The production of the company's own locomotives was only a stopgap, that was without great success, even with an order for Prussian state railway supplies. In 1905, Freudenstein merged with Orenstein & Koppel. This led shortly afterward to liquidation and closure of Freudenstein's plant at Tempelhof.

Production figures
The last definite works number is FNr.238, built in 1905.  

It is currently not known the exact number of locomotives that were built by Freudenstein, but it is estimated to be approximately 250, 5 are known to be preserved:

References

Defunct locomotive manufacturers of Germany